Kirby & The Amazing Mirror is a 2004 platform video game developed by HAL Laboratory, Flagship and Dimps and published by Nintendo for the Game Boy Advance. The seventh mainline Kirby entry, the game is notable for being the only installment in the entire series where King Dedede makes no appearance whatsoever, for its unique Metroidvania playstyle and being the first in the genre to support cooperative multiplayer.

Plot
There is a Mirror World that exists in the skies of Dream Land where any wish reflected in the mirror will come true. However, it copies the mind of a mysterious figure one day and creates a reflected world of evil. Meta Knight notices this and flies up to save the Mirror World.

Meanwhile, Kirby is taking a walk when Dark Meta Knight appears. Before Kirby can react, Dark Meta Knight slices Kirby in four and Kirby becomes four different colored Kirbys. They chase after Dark Meta Knight on a Warp Star simultaneously and enter the Mirror World.

It is revealed that the two Meta Knights fought each other until the real Meta Knight was defeated. He was then knocked into the mirror, which was in turn cut into eight fragments by Dark Meta Knight and scattered across the Mirror World, prompting the Kirbys to save Meta Knight and the Mirror World. After collecting all eight mirror fragments, Kirby enters the Mirror World and battles Dark Meta Knight. After defeating him, a vortex appears and sucks Kirby in, who is given Meta Knight's sword. Kirby then proceeds to fight Dark Mind, the true mastermind behind the Mirror World's corruption, multiple times. Upon defeat, the Mirror World is saved, and Shadow Kirby (the Mirror World counterpart of Kirby who was believed to be an enemy, but is now an ally) waves his goodbyes to the four Kirbys as they all exit the Mirror World one by one. Meta Knight also drops his Master sword before leaving the Mirror World, marking it as a symbol for the Mirror World's protection.

Gameplay

Unlike the other Kirby games, Kirby & The Amazing Mirror features a maze layout, and is traversed in a Metroidvania style. The game map branches out in several directions and, providing Kirby has the proper power at his disposal, he is able to go anywhere in almost any order, excluding the final sequence. 

The player explores the worlds, solving puzzles, defeating enemies, and collecting items. Occasionally, a sub-boss will be encountered, at which point the screen will lock into place until the boss is defeated. Swallowing a sub-boss after defeat usually grants a rare or exclusive copy ability. The player will also occasionally encounter "rest areas" of sorts.

The player can collect various items to improve in-game performance, such as extra health points and lives, food to replenish health, and batteries for the Cellphone. The game also features two other collectibles: music sheets, which act as a sound test mode once the music player item is found, and spray paint, which can be used to recolor the player's Kirby. There are also three minigames accessible from the menu, which support single player and multiplayer:

 Speed Eaters- A game in which the four Kirbys are seated around a covered platter. Once the lid is whisked away at a random time, the fastest person to press the A button and suck in the food on the platter is filled up more (measured by a gauge above each Kirby). 
 Crackity Hack- A game in which the four Kirbys are challenged to break a rock as much as they can, in a similar style to a microgame from Kirby Super Star. 
 Kirby's Wave Ride- A game in which the Kirbys, atop Warp Stars, race over a water track that varies in length and complexity depending on the difficulty setting, similar to the GameCube racing game Kirby Air Ride.

The game also features multiplayer, and the player can call other players or CPU-controlled Kirbys to the location with an in-game cell phone. There are several new powers in The Amazing Mirror, such as Cupid (called Angel in the Japanese version), which allows Kirby to fly around with wings and a halo and fire arrows; Missile, which turns Kirby into a missile that can be guided in any direction and will explode on contact with a wall or an enemy or when the B button is hit; and Smash, which gives Kirby the abilities he had in Super Smash Bros. Melee.

Development
The game is a collaboration between HAL Laboratory, Flagship, and Dimps. Capcom's subsidiary Flagship was responsible for the main planning. Dimps was in charge of programming, design, and sound, while HAL Laboratory provided artwork and debugging services. The game features soundtrack by Hironobu Inagaki and Atsuyoshi Isemura, but some tracks were reserved from Kirby: Nightmare in Dream Land.

Virtual Console

On August 1, 2011, Nintendo announced that Kirby & The Amazing Mirror would be available to limited Nintendo 3DS owners via Virtual Console, along with nine other Game Boy Advance games that were announced; it was released on December 16, 2011, to join the upcoming Nintendo 3DS price-cut and the Ambassador program starting August 11, 2011. This offer is available in all territories and only to those who became eligible in the Ambassador program (by accessing the Nintendo eShop before the date of the price-cut). Nintendo has no plans to release this game, or any other Game Boy Advance games, to the general public in paid form on the 3DS.

The game was also released on the both the Wii U's Virtual Console on April 3, 2014 in Japan and April 10, 2014 in North America, Europe, and Australia, and will be released on the Nintendo Switch Online + Expansion Pack service in 2023.

Reception

In the United States, Kirby & The Amazing Mirror sold 620,000 copies and earned $19 million by August 2006. During the period between January 2000 and August 2006, it was the 43rd highest-selling game launched for the Game Boy Advance, Nintendo DS, or PlayStation Portable in that country. The game ended up selling 1.47 million copies worldwide.

The Amazing Mirror received "favorable" reviews according to the review aggregation website Metacritic. In Japan, Famitsu gave it a score of one nine, one ten, one nine, and one eight for a total of 36 out of 40.  It received a runner-up position in GameSpot's 2004 "Best Game Boy Advance Game" and "Best Platformer" award categories, losing to Astro Boy: Omega Factor and Ratchet & Clank: Up Your Arsenal, respectively.

IGN commented on the level design, stating that discovering the hidden pathways that's the real challenge." GameSpot called the layout "daunting," but commented on the map feature. The graphics and sound were referred to as cute, though not amazing.

Notes

References

External links
 Official U.S. Kirby website
 

2004 video games
Cooperative video games
Dimps games
Flagship (company) games
Game Boy Advance games
HAL Laboratory games
Kirby (series) platform games
Metroidvania games
Multiplayer and single-player video games
Nintendo Switch Online games
Video games about magic
Video games about parallel universes
Video games developed in Japan
Virtual Console games for Nintendo 3DS
Virtual Console games for Wii U
Virtual Console games